Holmfield railway station is a closed railway station that served the village of Holmfield in Halifax, West Yorkshire, England.

History

It became a through station with the opening of the line to Halifax on 1 September 1879 (goods) with passenger services not starting along the entire route until 1 December 1879. It became a junction with the opening of the Halifax High Level railway to St. Paul's (Halifax) on 5 September 1890. The station closed to passengers 23 May 1955 with goods facilities remaining via Queensbury until 28 May 1956 and via Halifax until 27 June 1960.

Very little now remains to show that this was once a busy country junction. The overbridge carrying Holdsworth Road at the northern end of the station still exists, with a flooded cutting stretching north from the bridge. The bridge walls show where the station access steps were.

In March 2008 a planning application was submitted to redevelop the existing disused industrial buildings on the remaining unused railway land to build mixed use industrial units.

Route

References

External links
 Holmfield station on navigable 1947 O. S. map

Disused railway stations in Calderdale
Former Halifax and Ovenden Junction Railway stations
Railway stations in Great Britain opened in 1878
Railway stations in Great Britain closed in 1955